Crewe railway station is a railway station in Crewe, Cheshire, England.  It opened in 1837 and is one of the most historically significant railway stations in the world.

Crewe station is a major junction on the West Coast Main Line and serves as a rail gateway for North West England. It is 158 miles north of London Euston and 243 miles south of Glasgow Central. It is located at the point where the lines to Manchester Piccadilly and North Wales diverge from this route, and is the last major station before the branch to Liverpool Lime Street diverges. It is also served by lines to Stoke-on-Trent and Shrewsbury.

Crewe railway station has twelve platforms and a modern passenger entrance containing a bookshop and ticket office. Passengers access the platforms via a footbridge, stairs and lifts. The platform buildings dating from the 19th century contain two bookshops, bars, buffets and waiting rooms. The last major expenditure on the station was in 1985 when the track layout was remodelled and station facilities updated.

History

Early years
Crewe's location was chosen after Winsford, seven miles to the north, had rejected an earlier proposal, as had local landowners in neighbouring Nantwich, four miles away.

Crewe station was the first station to have its own adjacent railway hotel: the Crewe Arms Hotel, built in 1838, and still in use. It was the first to be completely rebuilt owing to the need for expansion. It was the also first to have completely independent rail lines built around it to ease traffic congestion.

The station opened on 4 July 1837 on the Grand Junction Railway. The purpose was to link the four largest cities of England by joining the existing Liverpool and Manchester Railway with the projected London & Birmingham Railway. The first long-distance railway in the world, it ran from Curzon Street railway station in Birmingham to Dallam in Warrington, Cheshire, where it made an end-on junction with the Warrington and Newton Railway, a branch of the L&M.

 
The station was built in the township of Crewe, which formed part of the ancient parish of Barthomley. The township later became a civil parish in its own right, and, later still, was renamed Crewe Green to avoid confusion with the town of Crewe, which was adjacent to it. The station was at the point where the line crossed the turnpike road linking the Trent and Mersey and the Shropshire Union Canals. Since the land was bought from the Earl of Crewe, whose mansion stood nearby, and it was located in the township of Crewe, the station was called Crewe. The railway station gave its name to the town of Crewe that was actually situated in the ancient parish of Coppenhall. In 1936, the railway station was transferred from the civil parish of Crewe to the then municipal borough of Crewe.

As soon as the station opened the Chester and Crewe Railway was formed to build a branch line to Chester and this company was absorbed by the GJR shortly before it opened to traffic in 1840. A locomotive depot was built to serve the Chester line, and to provide banking engines to assist trains southwards from Crewe up the Madeley Incline, a modest gradient which was a challenge to the small engines of the day.

By 1841, the Chester line was seen as a starting point for a new trunk line to the port of Holyhead, to provide the fastest route to Ireland, and the importance of Crewe as a junction station began to be established. This was given further endorsement when the Manchester and Birmingham Railway, a separate undertaking which had hoped to build a wholly independent line linking the two cities, shorter than the GJR, decided that it would be uneconomical to compete with that line over the greater part of its length, and decided to divert its own line to meet the GJR at Crewe. Teething squabbles between the companies delayed the running of through services for a while, and the M&B had to build a temporary station of their own, part of which survives today as an isolated platform next to the North Junction, at the start of the line to Manchester.

In 1842 the GJR decided to move its locomotive works from Edge Hill in Liverpool to Crewe, siting the works to the north of the junction between the Warrington and Chester lines. To house the workforce and company management the town of Crewe was built by the company to the north of the works.

London & North Western Railway
In 1846 the GJR merged with the London and Birmingham to form the London and North Western Railway Company, which until its demise in 1923 was the largest company in the world. The new company extended the existing lines to Holyhead, the Warrington line to Lancaster and Carlisle, the Manchester line to Leeds, and built the new Crewe and Shrewsbury Railway to Shrewsbury to join the joint GWR owned Shrewsbury and Hereford Railway, which provided connections to South Wales. The North Staffordshire Railway built a line from Stoke-on-Trent, joining the LNWR from the South East. Crewe was the centre of a wide-ranging railway network, and freight-handling facilities grew up to the south of the station.

To cope with the increase of traffic, the station was rebuilt in 1867 (according to WH Chaloner), the buildings facing each other on the present platforms 5 and 6 dating from this time, and built under the supervision of William Baker. The listing by English Heritage describes them as: mirrored design with bowed projections for the platform inspectors' offices, the 'greybeard' keystones and vivid polychromy ... one of the best pieces of mid-C19 platform architecture designed anywhere on the LNWR network, and as rare surviving examples nationally of buildings of a major junction station of this period.

At the same time the works was redeveloped and enlarged and the town also enlarged under the leadership of John Ramsbottom, a Stockport man who had become Locomotive Superintendent. Locomotive construction, hitherto divided with Wolverton (on the London and Birmingham Railway) was concentrated at Crewe. Ramsbottom also built a steelworks, the first in the world to make large-scale use of the Bessemer process, as only the LNWR required enough steel to keep a Bessemer plant continuously occupied. He also introduced mass-production techniques, whereby as many parts as possible were identical between one engine and another.

Ramsbottom retired in 1871 and was succeeded by the legendary Frank Webb, a colourful and controversial figure who was known as 'The Uncrowned King of Crewe'.

By the 1890s a survey revealed 1,000 trains passing within a 24-hour period. Half of these were freight trains which did not need to call at the station, so the company decided to build a separate four-track railway line passing to the west of the station, joining the existing lines beyond the north and south junctions, burrowing beneath them and avoiding them completely. Plans for the "independent lines" were approved in 1895 and construction lasted from 1896 to 1901. Over 1,000 labourers were employed on what was known as the "big dig" at a cost about £500,000. This undertaking also included a marshalling yard to the south of the station at Basford Hall, a revolutionary 'tranship shed' which allowed fast transfer of freight from wagons to road vehicles under cover. The station was enlarged between 1903 and 1907, by providing eight through platforms each a quarter of a mile long. The cost of the improvements was £1,000,000.

London Midland and Scottish Railway

In 1923 the LNWR became part of the London, Midland & Scottish Railway group. Crewe remained the major centre for locomotive construction. In 1938-39 the signal boxes at North and South Junctions were completely reconstructed as massive concrete structures to withstand air raids, and remained in use until the resignalling project in 1985. The North Junction signal box can now be visited as part of the Crewe Heritage Centre. Although the railway station is virtually synonymous with the town of Crewe, it was not actually incorporated within the borders of the borough of Crewe until the late 1930s, as it lies about 1 mile to the south east of the actual town centre.

With the exception of two new signal boxes and associated greatly improved colour light signalling, track circuiting and electrically operated track points, train operation at Crewe changed little in over fifty years. The trains did become longer and heavier and were hauled by larger engines, which required increased supplies of water to be taken on board before departure, but the number of passenger trains using Crewe Station and the method of operation did not vary greatly despite the passage of two world wars. Trains continued to divide at Crewe with the front portion for Manchester and the rear for Liverpool. The station pilot engine always had a pair of restaurant cars in a bay platform ready to attach to a morning service to London. Always there were extra coaches waiting to be attached to overcrowded trains. In addition to passengers there were vast quantities of mail, parcels and even live animals and birds of all descriptions transported in specially designed transit crates. When necessary the station staff had to feed and water these special passengers, which travelled in copious luggage vans.

British Railways

In 1948 the LMS was nationalised as British Railways, London Midland Region. Nationalisation greatly facilitated the modernisation of British Railways and, after a false start developing new improved steam engines, electrification came, along with diesel power and fixed-formation air-braked trains. These changes had a significant effect on Crewe station. Notably, the variation in station use caused firstly by the electrification in stages of the West Coast Main Line between 1959 and 1974 and secondly by the general end of steam traction on Britain's railways. Following the completion of electrification in 1974, trains did not need to change locomotives at Crewe, except for the London to Chester and Holyhead service. Many locomotive hauled trains were replaced by electric or diesel multiple unit trains, with much faster turn-round times. Additionally, two local branch lines had closed, which resulted in fewer trains terminating at Crewe. However, compensating for the decline of local passenger traffic, the reduction in mail and parcels traffic and the total elimination of livestock carriage, came the great increase in inter-city passenger traffic and the need for even faster, smoother and more efficient handling of passenger trains.

In 1963 the architects to the London Midland Region of British Railways provided a Porte-cochère at the passenger entrance on Nantwich Road. It was constructed of eight laminated wood Hyperbolic paraboloid shells. This was replaced between 1983 and 1985 with the current steel structure.

In 1985 in a £14.3 million scheme, the track layout was modernised and simplified, eliminating many points and crossings and allowing  running over the North Junction. At the same time all but one of the six 1902 extension platforms were taken out of use. Four Class 40 locomotives were reallocated to this work in 1985, and were renumbered as 97405–97408 for the engineering duties.

Present day

In 2007 Network Rail published a proposal to replace the existing Crewe station with a new station located approximately 1 mile to the south. A "Crewe Town" station was also proposed nearer the town centre on the Chester line, with a shuttle service to the new main station. In 2009 the station was identified as one of the ten worst category B interchange stations for mystery shopper assessment of fabric and environment.

The proposal to move the station was abandoned in 2010 and instead the current building was renovated. Cheshire East Council implemented a regeneration master plan for Crewe, which included the station.

In 2011 Cheshire East Council purchased the former Royal Mail depot and Weston House for £2.75 million. The council demolished the two buildings and created a new entrance to the station, as well as a 244 space car park, at a cost of £7 million. The construction work was undertaken by Balfour Beatty. The new entrance has step-free access & connects passengers to the station through an underground walkway. There is a ticket vending machine at this entrance, as well as unmanned ticket barriers.

In August 2016 the station buildings of 1867 were added to the National Heritage List for England as a Grade II listed building.  The structures included in the listing comprise two station buildings on separate platforms, and two screen walls, one to the east and the other to the west of the station.

With seven train companies calling, Crewe is tied with Doncaster for the highest number of companies calling at a UK station.

Future

In January 2013, it was announced that the existing Crewe station would be a stop on the western branch of the planned HS2 high-speed rail route.

A new platform will be built on the Manchester independent lines to the west of the station, meaning that services will not have to cross the West Coast Main Line from Manchester Piccadilly or the Marches Line to South Wales.

Following the Crewe Hub consultation, which ran from July to October 2017, it is planned that up to 5 to 7 trains per hour will stop at Crewe; plans for a new service to Manchester via Stafford, Stoke-on-Trent and Macclesfield are also proposed. This will be made possible by extending the existing platform 5 to 400 metres, allowing services to split and serve these additional destinations. It is also planned that a new transfer deck will be built; this will allow passengers to change between the proposed new Manchester independent lines platform and the existing Crewe station.

Schematic layout

Current services 
During the day, there are 16 trains passing through every hour (with additional less frequent services). As a summary, in trains per hour (tph):

Avanti West Coast
 1 tph to  via 

London Northwestern Railway
 1 tph to 

Northern
 2 tph to —one via  and one via 

Transport for Wales
 1 tph to 
 1 tpd to  via the Heart of Wales line

East Midlands Railway
 1 tph to  via  and 

Caledonian Sleeper
 1 tpd to //, dividing at 

Platform Use
Platform 1 - Northern Trains stopping services to and from Manchester Piccadilly and occasionally Avanti West Coast northbound services to Manchester Piccadilly and Avanti West Coast southbound services to London Euston.
Platform 2 - Extra capacity.
Platform 3 - East Midlands Railway services to and from Derby.
Platform 4 - West Midlands Trains (London Northwestern) services to and from London Euston.
Platform 5 - Avanti West Coast northbound services to Manchester Piccadilly and southbound to Birmingham New Street and London Euston, West Midlands Trains services to Birmingham New Street, Transport for Wales services to Cardiff, CrossCountry services to Bournemouth and Bristol Temple Meads.
Platform 6 - Transport for Wales services northbound to Manchester Piccadilly and southbound to Cardiff and beyond. Some Avanti West Coast northbound services to Preston and Glasgow Central and southbound to London Euston also use this platform along with a CrossCountry service to Manchester Piccadilly.
Platform 7 - West Midlands Trains (London Northwestern) services to London Euston via Rugeley Trent Valley
Platform 8 - Transport for Wales stopping services to and from Shrewsbury.
Platform 9 - Transport for Wales services to Chester and Holyhead.
Platform 10 - Extra capacity.
Platform 11 - Avanti West Coast northbound services to Blackpool, Edinburgh, Liverpool, Chester and North Wales. West Midlands Trains (London Northwestern) northbound services to Liverpool Lime Street.
Platform 12 - Extra capacity and usually used for railtours.

See also

Listed buildings in Crewe

References

Bibliography

Further reading

External links

Railway stations in Cheshire
DfT Category B stations
Former London and North Western Railway stations
Railway stations in Great Britain opened in 1837
Railway stations served by Caledonian Sleeper
Railway stations served by CrossCountry
Railway stations served by East Midlands Railway
Northern franchise railway stations
Railway stations served by Transport for Wales Rail
Railway stations served by Avanti West Coast
Railway stations served by West Midlands Trains
Buildings and structures in Crewe
John Cunningham railway stations
Grade II listed buildings in Cheshire
Stations on the West Coast Main Line